Raymond McCullough (1919 – June 1985) was a Northern Ireland politician with the Ulster Unionist Party.

McCullough, who was Honorary Secretary of the South Down Unionist Association, was elected to Banbridge District Council on that body's creation in 1973 and subsequently served as chairman. He was elected to the Northern Ireland Assembly at the 1982 election to represent South Down and remained a member until his death, serving as deputy chairman of the Agriculture Committee and a member of the Environment Committee. He was also a member of the committee of the Grand Orange Lodge of Ireland.

Following his death McCullough's Assembly seat was won by Jeffrey Donaldson whilst his council seat went to his daughter Vivienne McCullough as an independent Unionist.

References

1919 births
1985 deaths
Northern Ireland MPAs 1982–1986
Ulster Unionist Party councillors
Members of Banbridge District Council
Politicians from County Down